Anexartisias Street is located in the Old Town of Limassol. It hosts many retail stores as well as  Gregori Afxentiou Square, where events (such as New Year's Eve) are held.

History 
The street first showed signs of growth in 1923; The Independence of The Republic of Cyprus in 1960 was an important day in the History of Cyprus, and it was the call for the street to be named after it; Anexartisias (meaning “Independence”).

 In its first years of growth, the Limassol Hospital (now the District Administration Building) was built; during the times when the street wasn't named.
 Around 1930–1940 the street was referred to as “Macedonias Street”.

Features 
The main attractions are, evidently, the multitude of shops and cafes hosted on the street, which are what made it so well known to the residents of the area.

Other than shops, the District Office is also located in the street. The District administration also takes part in decorating the street and the surrounding ones with decorations (for example: Christmas).

Controversies & Incidents

Incidents

Collapsed Roof, February 2022 
On Sunday (20/02), the roof of a building collapsed, after renovations; due to poor concrete stability testing. Pedestrians and vehicles were in the incident site during the collapse; with no injuries or damages to the vehicles. The building was owned by a church administration in the area.

Controversies

H&M Opening 
In February 2021, the Swedish-Brand, H&M, announced that they were building a new branch in the street. It was scheduled to open the Summer of that year. The opening was later postponed to 18 November 2021, before it was finally opened 3 March 2022. The 8-month delay surely had upset many shoppers and once it opened, there was criticism around the “unfinished” building, especially after months of delay.

Transportation 
 EMEL  ANEXARTISIAS - DISTRICT OFFICE

The street is a two-lane road, mainly connected by Gladstonos (Dual-Carriageway) and 28 October Avenue.

The street is also connected to many smaller neighborhoods and roads.

See also 

 Limassol District
 List of shopping streets and districts by city
 List of shopping malls in Cyprus
 Cyprus

References 

Streets in Cyprus